Rev. W.R. "Smokie" Norful, Jr.  is an American gospel singer and pianist, best known for his 2002 album, I Need You Now and his 2004 release, Nothing Without You, which won a Grammy at the 47th Annual Grammy Awards for Best Contemporary Soul Gospel Album in 2004.
Norful received his second Grammy in 2015 at the 57th Annual Grammy awards for his song "No Greater Love", ten years after winning his first.

Discography

Albums
I Need You Now (Chordant Music Group, 2002)
I Need You Now: Limited Edition (EMI, 2003) (4 new tracks plus 4 new versions)
Nothing Without You (EMI Gospel, 2004)
Nothing Without You Special Edition CD+DVD (EMI, 2005)
Life Changing (EMI Gospel, 2006)
Smokie Norful Live (Tre'Myles Music/EMI, 2009)
How I Got Over...Songs That Carried Us (Tre'Myles Music/EMI, 2011)
Once in a Lifetime (Tre'Myles Music/EMI, 2012)
Forever Yours (Tre'Myles Music 2014)

References 

http://www.getthevictory.org/contentpages/10709/cbaa26e2-f039-40f3-ae44-0bc9bba92586/OurPastor.aspx

External links
http://www.smokienorful.com/
http://www.blackgospel.com/psalmists/smokienorful/interview/2006/
http://www.getthevictory.org

20th-century African-American male singers
Grammy Award winners
American gospel singers
Singers from Arkansas
People from Pine Bluff, Arkansas
Living people
Garrett–Evangelical Theological Seminary alumni
1975 births
21st-century American singers
21st-century American male singers
21st-century African-American male singers